The Holy Mother of God Church of Voskepar is a 7th-century Armenian church in Voskepar, Armenia, adjacent to the border with Azerbaijan. Its design is that of a cruciform central plan, the "Mastara" type. The roof was originally made of tiles. The church was reconstructed in 1975–1977. Despite heavy fighting during the First Nagorno-Karabakh War having spread to the area (Tavush Province of Armenia/Gazakh Rayon of Azerbaijan), and the destruction of the immediately adjacent Azeri village, Aşağı Əskipara (Lower Askipara), the church still stands.

References 

Index of Armenian Art: Armenian Architecture:"VOSKEPAR (Oskepar)", Institute for Armenian Studies, University of California, Fresno
(Russian): "Церковь Аствацацин (Воскепар, Армения)", Армянская энциклопедия фонда «Хайазг» ("Hayazg" Armenian Encyclopedia Fund)

7th-century churches in Armenia
Armenian Apostolic churches in Armenia
Buildings and structures in Tavush Province
Voskepar
Christian monasteries in Armenia